"Don't Wake Me" is a song by Australian pop-rock group Uncanny X-Men. The song was released in September 1986 as the second single from the band's second studio album, What You Give Is What You Get. The song  peaked at number 31 on the Kent Music Report.

Track listing 
7" Vinyl (CBS - BA 3486)
 "Don't Wake Me" 
 "Truckin' on into Alice"

Charts

References

1986 singles
Uncanny X-Men (band) songs
CBS Records singles
1986 songs